WJLN (88.7 FM) is a radio station licensed to serve the community of White Springs, Florida. The station is owned by Faith and Action Community Outreach, Inc. It airs a religious format.

The station was assigned the WJLN call letters by the Federal Communications Commission on November 19, 2010.

References

External links
 Official Website
 

Radio stations established in 2014
2014 establishments in Florida
Hamilton County, Florida
JLN